This is the discography of Swedish pop group Ace of Base. The group is the third best-selling group from Sweden after ABBA and Roxette with an estimated 50 million records sold worldwide. This is a list with all of their albums and singles released, along with highest chart positions reached in major territories. Extended chart information, artwork and track listings can be found on individual pages. To date, they have released five studio albums and 28 singles.

Albums

Studio albums

Compilation albums

Box sets

Extended plays

Singles

Home video

Music videos
This is a list of official music videos for Ace of Base singles and when they were released.

References

Ace of Base
Pop music group discographies
Discographies of Swedish artists